Feţele Albe may refer to:
 Feţele Albe Dacian fortress, a Dacian fortified settlement
 Feţele Albe castra, a fort in the Roman province of Dacia